The Fillauer Brothers Building is a historic structure in downtown Cleveland, Tennessee, part of the Cleveland Commercial Historic District, built in 1911. It was listed on the National Register of Historic Places (NRHP) in 1989.

Description and history
The building was built in 1911 by brothers John B. and William Fillauer. It consists of three stories with a basement. It originally contained the Moneta theater, a silent movie theater and a hardware store. The building was renovated in 1961. The building was restored to its original condition in 1987, and since then it has housed the Bank of Cleveland. It was listed on the NRHP on June 28, 1989.

See also
Cleveland Commercial Historic District
National Register of Historic Places listings in Bradley County, Tennessee

References

National Register of Historic Places in Bradley County, Tennessee
Buildings and structures in Bradley County, Tennessee
Commercial buildings completed in 1911
Cleveland, Tennessee
1911 establishments in Tennessee
Individually listed contributing properties to historic districts on the National Register in Tennessee